Deronectes is a genus of beetle in family Dytiscidae. It contains the following species:

 Deronectes abnormicollis Semenov, 1900
 Deronectes afghanicus Wewalka, 1970
 Deronectes algibensis Fery & Fresneda, 1988
 Deronectes angelinii Fery & Brancucci, 1997
 Deronectes angulipennis (Peyron, 1858)
 Deronectes angusi Fery & Brancucci, 1990
 Deronectes aubei (Mulsant, 1843)
 Deronectes balkei Fery & Hosseinie, 1998
 Deronectes bameuli Fery & Hosseinie, 1998
 Deronectes bicostatus (Schaum, 1864)
 Deronectes biltoni Fery & Hosseinie, 1998
 Deronectes brancuccii Fery & Hosseinie, 1998
 Deronectes brannanii (Schaufuss, 1869)
 Deronectes costipennis Brancucci, 1983
 Deronectes danielssoni Fery & Hosseinie, 1998
 Deronectes delarouzei (Jacquelin du Val, 1857)
 Deronectes depressicollis (Rosenhauer, 1856)
 Deronectes doriae Sharp, 1882
 Deronectes elburs Fery, Erman & Hosseinie, 2001
 Deronectes elmii Fery & Hosseinie, 1998
 Deronectes evelynae Fery & Hosseinie, 1998
 Deronectes fairmairei (Leprieur, 1876)
 Deronectes ferrugineus Fery & Brancucci, 1987
 Deronectes fosteri Aguilera & Ribera, 1996
 Deronectes hakkariensis Wewalka, 1989
 Deronectes hebauerorum Fery & Hosseinie, 1998
 Deronectes hendrichi Fery & Hosseinie, 1998
 Deronectes hispanicus (Rosenhauer, 1856)
 Deronectes jaechi Wewalka, 1989
 Deronectes kinzelbachi Fery & Hosseinie, 1998
 Deronectes lareynii (Fairmaire, 1858)
 Deronectes latus (Stephens, 1829)
 Deronectes longipes Sharp, 1882
 Deronectes moestus (Fairmaire, 1858)
 Deronectes nilssoni Fery & Wewalka, 1992
 Deronectes opatrinus (Germar, 1824)
 Deronectes palaestinensis Fery & Hosseinie, 1999
 Deronectes parvicollis (Schaum, 1864)
 Deronectes perrinae Fery & Brancucci, 1997
 Deronectes persicus Peschet, 1914
 Deronectes peyerimhoffi (Régimbart, 1906)
 Deronectes platynotus (Lacordaire, 1835)
 Deronectes riberai Fery & Hosseinie, 1998
 Deronectes roberti Fery & Hosseinie, 1998
 Deronectes sahlbergi Zimmermann, 1932
 Deronectes schuberti Wewalka, 1970
 Deronectes semirufus (Germar, 1844)
 Deronectes syriacus Wewalka, 1970
 Deronectes theryi (Peyerimhoff, 1925)
 Deronectes toledoi Fery, Erman & Hosseinie, 2001
 Deronectes vestitus (Gebler, 1848)
 Deronectes wewalkai Fery & Fresneda, 1988
 Deronectes wittmeri Wewalka, 1970
 Deronectes witzgalli Fery & Brancucci, 1997
 Deronectes youngi Fery & Hosseinie, 1998

References

	

Dytiscidae
Taxonomy articles created by Polbot